Thumbs Up!  is a musical revue in two acts, with book by H. I. Phillips, Harold Atteridge, and Alan Baxter. The show had songs with lyrics by Ballard MacDonald and Earle Crooker and music by James F. Hanley and Henry Sullivan. Additional lyrics by Karl Stark, Ira Gershwin, John Murray Anderson, Irving Caesar, Jean Herbert, and Vernon Duke and additional music by Vernon Duke, Gerald Marks, and Steve Child. The show was produced by Eddie Dowling at the St. James Theatre. The revue opened on December 27, 1934.

The production was staged by John Murray Anderson and directed by Edward Clarke Lilley. It was choreographed by Robert Alton, scenic design by Ted Weidhaas, James Reynolds, and Raoul Pene Du Bois, and costume design by James Reynolds, Raoul Pene Du Bois, Thomas Becher and James Morcom. The musical director was Gene Salzer. The music was orchestrated by Hans Spialek, Conrad Salinger and David Raksin. It ran for 156 performances, closing on May 11, 1935. The cast headlined Eddie Dowling, Clark & McCullough, Ray Dooley, Paul Draper, Pickens Sisters, Rose King, Bob Lawrence, Hugh Cameron, and Ruben Garcia.

Being a revue, there's very little in the way of plot. Burns Mantle reported that the show “was both cleaner and brighter than most of the Broadway output” that season. “It included the missus, Sister Ray Dooley, the surviving member of that Dooley family which made life a lot brighter for thousands of playgoers during the early years of the century.”   The New York Times said: “It is so good-looking and it is played with such spirit that you are surprised to discover that it does not live up to the promise of the names in the program.”

Songs

Act 1
 “Beautiful Night” (lyrics by Karl Stark and Ballard MacDonald)
 “Zing! Went the Strings of My Heart” (lyrics by James Hanley)
 “Words Without Music” (lyrics by Ira Gershwin, music by Vernon Duke)
 “Lily Belle May June”
 “Flamenco”
 “Eileen Avourneen” (lyrics by John Murray Anderson)
 “The Torch Singer”
 “My Arab Complex”
 “Soldier of Love” (lyrics by Irving Caesar, music by Gerald Marks)

Act 2
 “Color Blind”
 “Tango Rhythms”*
 “Continental Honeymoon” (lyrics by Ballard MacDonald and James Hanley)
 “A Ship’s Concert in the Eighties”
 “Catherine the Great”
 “Rehearsal Hall”
 “Merrily We Waltz Along”
 “Gotta See a Man About His Daughter” (lyrics by Jean Herbert and Karl Stark)
 “Autumn in New York” (music & lyrics by Vernon Duke)

References

External links
 

Musicals by Vernon Duke
1934 musicals
Broadway musicals
Original musicals